15 video games based on the Ranma ½ manga and anime series exist, generally in the form of fighting games, RPGs, and puzzle games. Of all of them, only two of the Super Famicom fighting games have been adapted for Western release. They are listed below by platform.

Super Famicom

Ranma ½: Neighborhood Combat Chapter (Ranma ½: Chōnai Gekitōhen)
The first fighting game for the Super Famicom by NCS Corp, Neighborhood Combat Chapter underwent Americanization by Irem to become Street Combat, replacing all characters and background music with American-themed characters. An example is Ranma, who was replaced by a blonde man in bright blue armor called Steven. This is the only fighting game in which Cologne appears.

Ranma ½: Hard Battle

Ranma ½: Hidden Treasure of the Red Cat Gang (Ranma ½: Akaneko-dan teki Hihou)
An RPG that was released on October 22, 1993.

Ranma ½: Super-Skill Wild Dance Chapter (Ranma ½: Chougi Rambuhen)
This game was intended to be released in the USA under the title "Anything Goes Martial Arts" as the sequel to Hard Battle, but the company that owned the rights for it went out of business, Eventually the American release got cancelled. This is the only game to feature Mariko Konjo and Herb.

Ranma ½: Rock-Scissors-Puzzle (Ranma ½: Ougi Jaanken)
A puzzle game based on rock, paper, scissors. Hands are dropped showing the rock, paper, and scissor signs and are used to remove other hands that have the opposite sign. Its Japanese name is composed of ougi (meaning secret) and jaanken, a play on the word janken (the Japanese name for the game of rock-paper-scissors) but using the characters for evil, dark and fist. However, the furigana reading above the Japanese name is Guu•Choki•Pazuru, which translates to Rock-Scissors-Puzzle.

On release, Famicom Tsūshin scored the game a 20 out of 40.

Mega-CD

Ranma ½: White Orchid Serenade (Ranma ½: Byakuran Aika)

A video visual novel which uses a Rock-Paper-Scissors style battle system. It was released on April 23, 1993 for the Sega Mega-CD and introduces the character Arisa Nanjo (depicted in the center on the cover).

PlayStation

Ranma ½: Battle Renaissance

The only 3D Ranma ½ video game, developed by Atelier Double and published by Rumic Soft for the PlayStation in 1996. This game features changing weather conditions that turn some characters to their cursed forms or vice versa when they get soaked in cold or hot water, affecting strategy. This is the only fighting game in which Ryu Kumon and Rouge appear. After playing the game at the November 1996 PlayStation Expo, Stuart Levy and Ed Semrad of Electronic Gaming Monthly commented, "Hopefully somebody will pick up this excellent game here in the States."

Game Boy

Ranma ½ (Ranma ½: Kakuren Bodesu Match)
Similar to the Adventures of Lolo, this game features Ranma pushing and breaking blocks around a maze-like environment. The player could change gender in order to move blocks greater or shorter distances as needed.

Ranma ½: Vehement Melee Chapter (Ranma ½: Netsuretsu Kakutouhen)
An RPG with fighting game elements, this game immerses the player in a day in Ranma's life, traveling to various locations in the series and fighting various characters.

Ranma ½: Character Q&A!! (Ranma ½: Kakugeki Mondou!!)
Using a top-down view similar to the first Ranma ½ Game Boy game, this game primarily focuses on trivia from the Ranma ½ anime. The player moves Ranma around town and encounters various characters who ask questions regarding the series.

PC Engine

Ranma ½
A side-scrolling fighting game similar to Final Fight, where the player moves Ranma through various locations. Following the manga story line up to Ranma's second battle with Ryoga, the game also included animated cutscenes.

Ranma ½: The Captive Bride (Ranma ½: Toraware no Hanayome)
Similar to White Orchid Serenade, this game combines video visual novel elements with text-based commands.

The game was rated 22.38 out of 30 by PC Engine Fan magazine.

Ranma ½: Knockdown, The Founder's Anything-Goes Melee-Style! (Ranma ½: Datou, Ganso Musabetsu Kakutou-ryuu!)
Similar to the first Ranma ½ PC Engine game, this game follows the next major story arc of the Ranma ½ manga.

PC

Ranma ½: Flying Dragon Legend (Ranma ½: Hiryu Densetsu)
A point-and-click adventure for the NEC PC-9800 and MSX personal computers. In this game, the player takes the role of Ranma as he/she interacts with situations and characters via on-screen icons, only occasionally involving combat by using a multiple-option interface.

Pachinko

Fever Ranma ½: Hot Springs Athletic Chapter (Fever Ranma ½: Onsen Asurechikku Hen)
Released in February 2011 in Japan, Fever Ranma ½ features high-quality animations and sound effects with the newer anime style look from Nightmare! Incense of Spring Sleep.

Others
Two Nintendo DS games were released in 2009, titled Sunday x Magazine: Nettou Dream Nine and Sunday x Magazine: White Comic. The first is a baseball game that commemorates the 50th anniversary of Weekly Shōnen Sunday and Weekly Shōnen Magazine, featuring characters from manga series that ran in the magazines. The second is an RPG that features over 300 characters from the magazines' series. Ranma ½ characters appear in both these games—Ranma and Akane in the first, and Ranma, Akane, Ryoga and Shampoo in the second.

Sortable game list

References

 

Video games
Ranma 1/2 video games
Ranma 1/2
Ranma 1/2
Ranma 1/2